Sachit Patil is an Indian actor, director, writer and theatre director. He is known for his work in Marathi cinema. He made his debut in the Bollywood film Kyon? (2003). He made his Marathi film debut with Avdhoot Gupte's Zenda (2010), which was a success at the box office. He made his directorial debut with the superhit Saade Maade Teen.

Career
Sachit began his film career with the 2003 Suspense thriller, Kyon?. He then appeared in Sab Kuch Hai Kuch Bhi Nai (2005) and Raasta Roko (2006).

He made his directorial debut in 2007 with the superhit Saade Maade Teen. He then made his Marathi film debut in 2010 with Avdhoot Gupte's Zenda (2010), which was a superhit at the box office. He then directed and also appeared in Kshanbhar Vishranti, opposite Sonalee Kulkarni, which became a superhit at the box office. He then appeared in the action thriller film Arjun, which also became a superhit at the box office.

In 2015, he appeared in gray character in the blockbuster film Classmates, directed by Aditya Sarpotdar. In 2017, he got the role in Asa Mee Tashi Ti opposite to Pallavi Subhash. He was appearing on Colors Marathi TV show Radha Prem Rangi Rangali.

Personal life
Sachit Patil Completed his education from Ruparel College in Mumbai. Sachit married his college friend Shilpa Pai.
On 8 September 2012 Sachit was arrested along with five others when police raided a Goa massage parlour and rescued five women later released Mid-day news. He belongs to the Somvanshi Kshatriya Pathare Panchkalshi, an ethnic upper caste community of Hindu society in Maharashtra, India.

Filmography

Television

References

External links

Indian male film actors
Male actors from Mumbai
21st-century Indian male actors
Male actors in Marathi cinema
Male actors in Hindi cinema
1979 births
Living people
Male actors in Marathi television